Kolchiko is a village and a community of the Lagkadas municipality. Before the 2011 local government reform it was part of the municipality of Lagkadas, of which it was a municipal district. The 2011 census recorded 1,831 inhabitants in the village and 2,062 inhabitants in the community of Kolchiko. The community of Kolchiko covers an area of 45.449 km2.

Administrative division
The community of Kolchiko consists of two separate settlements: 
Drakontio (population 231)
Kolchiko (population 1,831)
The aforementioned population figures are as of 2011.

See also
 List of settlements in the Thessaloniki regional unit

References

Populated places in Thessaloniki (regional unit)